Jason L. Riley (born July 8, 1971) is an American conservative commentator and author. He is a member of The Wall Street Journals editorial board. Riley is a senior fellow at the Manhattan Institute and has appeared on the Journal Editorial Report, other Fox News programs and C-SPAN. He is Black and writes about his Black experience in America as a Conservative.

He's is the author of four books: Let Them In: The Case for Open Borders (2008), Please Stop Helping Us: How Liberals Make It Harder for Blacks to Succeed (2014), False Black Power? (2017), and Maverick: A Biography of Thomas Sowell (2021).

Early life and education 
Riley was born in Buffalo, New York. He is the son of Lee Riley of Buffalo and the late Ola Riley. His father retired as a social worker at the Buffalo Psychiatric Center, a residential psychiatric treatment hospital.  He grew up in a religious household. His mother was Baptist and later converted to become a Jehovah's Witness, and Riley was baptized a Jehovah's Witness when he was fifteen.

He earned a bachelor's of arts degree in English from the State University of New York at Buffalo and began his career in journalism working for the Buffalo News and USA Today.

Career 
Riley joined The Wall Street Journal in 1994 as a copyreader on the national news desk in New York City. In April 1996, he was named to the newly created position of editorial interactive editor, and joined the editorial board in 2005.

Riley is the author of four books. In 2008, he published Let Them In: The Case for Open Borders, which argues for a more free-market oriented U.S. immigration system.

In 2014, Riley published Please Stop Helping Us: How Liberals Make It Harder for Blacks to Succeed. The book was praised by Thomas Sowell of National Review, who wrote: "Pick up a copy and open pages at random to see how the author annihilates nonsense." According to Salon, "[t]he American left should start paying attention to The Wall Street Journals Jason Riley. His name is on the rise."

In his 2017 book False Black Power?, Riley argues economic success is a more important strategy for the empowerment of black people than dependence on political leadership. In 2021, Riley published Maverick: A Biography of Thomas Sowell.

Personal life 
Riley married Naomi Schaefer Riley, also a journalist, in 2004. They reside in suburban New York City with their three children.

Bibliography 
 Let Them In: The Case for Open Borders (2008)
 Please Stop Helping Us: How Liberals Make It Harder for Blacks to Succeed (2014)
 False Black Power? (2017)
 Maverick: A Biography of Thomas Sowell (2021)

See also
 Black conservatism in the United States

References

External links 
 
 

1971 births
21st-century African-American people
20th-century African-American people
African-American journalists
African-American writers
American male journalists
Living people
Manhattan Institute for Policy Research
New York (state) Republicans
University at Buffalo alumni
USA Today people
The Wall Street Journal people
Writers from Buffalo, New York